Porter Ward Lainhart (November 6, 1907 – August 18, 1991) was an American football quarterback who played one season with the Philadelphia Eagles of the National Football League. He played college football at Washington State University and attended Goldendale High School in Goldendale, Washington.

Professional career
Lainhart played in one game for the Philadelphia Eagles in 1933.

Personal life
Lainhart served in the United States Military during World War II.

References

External links
Just Sports Stats

1907 births
1991 deaths
Players of American football from Washington (state)
American football quarterbacks
Washington State Cougars football players
Philadelphia Eagles players
United States Army personnel of World War II
People from Goldendale, Washington
United States Army colonels